The 1999 Vuelta a Asturias was the 43rd edition of the Vuelta a Asturias road cycling stage race, which was held from 11 May to 16 May 1999. The race started in Gijón and finished in Oviedo. The race was won by Juan Carlos Domínguez of the  team.

General classification

References

Vuelta Asturias
1999 in Spanish road cycling
May 1999 sports events in Europe